Dongzhang Township is a township of Yuanshi County in southwestern Hebei province, China, located about  south-southeast of the county seat,  due south of Shijiazhuang, and located to the west of China National Highway 107. , it has 15 villages under its administration.

See also
List of township-level divisions of Hebei

References

Township-level divisions of Hebei